Hugo Geiger (1 July 1901 – 8 July 1984) was a German politician of the Christian Social Union in Bavaria (CSU) and former member of the German Bundestag.

Life 
In 1945 Geiger was a member of the Constituent Assembly of Bavaria, and from 1950 to 1953 he was also a member of the state parliament there.

Geiger was a member of the German Bundestag from 1953 to 1961. He represented the constituency of Tirschenreuth in parliament. From 1953 to 1957, Geiger was deputy chairman of the committee pursuant to Article 15 of the Basic Law, from 23 March 1956 to 10 January 1957 chairman of the Bundestag Committee on Atomic Questions, and from 1957 to 1961 deputy chairman of the Committee on Nuclear Energy and Water Management.

From 27 February 1958 to 29 November 1961, Geiger was also a member of the European Parliament.

Literature

References

1901 births
1984 deaths
Members of the Bundestag for Bavaria
Members of the Bundestag 1957–1961
Members of the Bundestag 1953–1957
Members of the Bundestag for the Christian Social Union in Bavaria
Members of the Landtag of Bavaria
MEPs for Germany 1958–1979
Christian Social Union in Bavaria MEPs